Le Cochon Danseur (English: The Dancing Pig) is a silent, 4 minute long, black-and-white burlesque film released in 1907 by French company Pathé, apparently based on a Vaudeville act.

Plot

In the film, a giant anthropomorphic pig, dressed in fancy clothes, dances with a girl, who later embarrasses him by tearing his clothes off. The two start to dance together, then walk into the curtains behind them. In the infamous final scene, the pig moves his tongue and eyes around and then bare his teeth, possibly in an attempt to show the puppet's mechanical abilities.

Legacy

The film had fallen into obscurity for over a century, but gained more notoriety around 2007, a century after its filming. It became an Internet meme, with Clarisse Loughrey stating that the film "will definitely be entering into your nightmares tonight."

Sources

External links
 
A1 Blues (1998), 2019 Music Video https://www.youtube.com/watch?v=NF-tZbClZw8

1907 films
French comedy short films
French dance films
French black-and-white films
Fictional pigs
French silent short films
Films about pigs
Film and television memes
French films based on plays
Articles containing video clips
Internet memes
1907 comedy films
Silent comedy films
1900s French films